Knoutsodonta brasiliensis is a species of sea slug, a dorid nudibranch, a shell-less marine gastropod mollusc in the family Onchidorididae.

Distribution
This species was described from Praia do Forno, Arraial do Cabo, State of Rio de Janeiro, Brazil.

Diet
The animals feed and lay eggs on the bryozoan Parasmittina protecta (Thornely, 1905).

References

Onchidorididae
Gastropods described in 2011